Eva Lake is a lake in Alberta, Canada.

Eva Lake was named after Eva Wallace, the wife of a surveyor.

See also
List of lakes of Alberta

References

Lakes of Alberta